Aristida divaricata is a species of grass known by the common name poverty threeawn. It is native to the Americas from the central United States to Guatemala. It is a perennial grass forming clumps of unbranched stems up to 70 centimeters tall. Leaves are mostly basal and roll along the edges. The sparse inflorescence is a wide, flat, open array of spikelets that break apart easily. The grain has a twisted tip and three awns up to 2 centimeters long.

External links
Jepson Manual Treatment
Grass Manual Treatment
Vascular Plants of the Gila Wilderness

divaricata
Taxa named by Aimé Bonpland
Taxa named by Alexander von Humboldt